South Gosforth Traction Maintenance Depot is a vehicle cleaning, maintenance and stabling facility used by the Tyne and Wear Metro. It was originally constructed for the London and North Eastern Railway, opening in October 1923.

History 
The line passing through the depot was opened on 1 March 1905 by the Gosforth and Ponteland Light Railway. The  branch line consisted of a single-track, running from South Gosforth, Tyne and Wear to Ponteland and Darras Hall, Northumberland. The line closed to passengers on 17 June 1929, but was re-opened as part of the Tyne and Wear Metro network, as far as Bank Foot on 10 May 1981, with a further extension to Newcastle Airport opening on 17 November 1991.

In 1918, a fire broke out at Heaton car sheds, which destroyed the building, as well as 34 cars. This led to a replacement depot being required. The site of the depot was acquired by the North Eastern Railway in 1921, with the replacement depot opening in October 1923. At the time, there was 10 lines in the depot building, with a further two serving the repair shop.

The depot was originally used to house rolling stock for the Tyneside Electrics network, which served Newcastle upon Tyne, as well as North and South Tyneside. The network was later converted back to diesel operation in the 1960s.

Prior to the opening of the Tyne and Wear Metro network in the early 1980s, Class 101, 104 and 105 DMUs were a common sight at the depot. These vehicles were used on the North Tyneside Loop, as well as services between Newcastle and South Shields.

Tyne and Wear Metro 
Since 1980, the depot has been operated by the Tyne and Wear Metro, and now houses a fleet of 87 Class 599 Metrocars. It is used for stabling, cleaning, maintenance and repair of the fleet.

It is located between Longbenton, Regent Centre and South Gosforth stations, and can be accessed by trains from both east and west. There is also a depot-avoiding line running from east to west, which is not regularly used in public service.

Prior to the arrival of new Stadler Rail rolling stock towards the end of 2021, a satellite depot has been being constructed near Howdon, North Tyneside. The site is currently being used as a temporary stabling and maintenance facility for up to 10 Metrocars, whilst the current depot at Gosforth is re-built. It opened in October 2020.

The first phase of demolition of the South Gosforth depot was completed by May 2021. The planned date for completion of the demolition is 2023.

The old South Gorforth Depot closed on 19 January 2023.

References

External links
 

Railway depots in England
Transport infrastructure completed in 1923
Tyne and Wear Metro
1923 establishments in England